Strongbow may refer to:

People
 Gilbert de Clare, 1st Earl of Pembroke, a Norman earl commonly known as "Strongbow"
 Richard de Clare, 2nd Earl of Pembroke, his son, also commonly known as "Strongbow"
 Jules Strongbow, wrestler in the 1980s–1990s
 Chief Jay Strongbow, wrestler in the 1940s–1980s

Fictional characters
 Beleg Cúthalion (literally "Strongbow"), a character in J. R. R. Tolkien's Quenta Silmarillion
 A character in the comic book Elfquest
 A Western character for DC Comics

Royal Navy
 , destroyer launched 1916, sunk 1917
 , submarine launched 1943, broken up 1946

Other
 Strongbow (cider)